The Frank Zappa AAAFNRAAAA Birthday Bundle 2010 is a compilation album released as a digital download through the Zappa Family Trust on Frank Zappa's 70th Birthday, December 21, 2010. It features both recordings by Zappa himself, as well as various covers of his material.

Track listing

External links
 

2010 compilation albums
Frank Zappa compilation albums
Compilation albums published posthumously
Dweezil Zappa albums
Covers albums
Zappa Records albums